Kimiya Yazdian Tehrani (born July 13, 1996) is an Iranian Basketball player for Iran women's national basketball team and Iran women's national 3x3 team.

She participated at the 18th Asian Games in Jakarta–Palembang, 2018 FIBA 3x3 World Cup and 2019 FIBA 3x3 World Cup – Women's tournament in Netherlands.

References 

1996 births
Living people
Iranian women's basketball players
People from Tehran
Basketball players at the 2018 Asian Games
Asian Games competitors for Iran